
In basketball, a rebound is the act of gaining possession of the ball after a missed field goal or free throw. The top 25 players in career rebounds in National Collegiate Athletic Association (NCAA) Division I women's basketball history are listed below. While the NCAA's current three-division format has been in place since the 1973–74 season, the organization did not sponsor women's sports until the 1981–82 school year; before that time, women's college sports were governed by the Association of Intercollegiate Athletics for Women (AIAW). The NCAA has officially recorded rebounding statistics since it first sponsored women's basketball.

To be listed in the NCAA record book, a player must have been active in at least three seasons during the era in which the NCAA governed women's sports—although for those players who qualify for inclusion in the record book, AIAW statistics are included.

The all-time leading rebounder in Division I history is Courtney Paris of Oklahoma, who recorded 2,034 rebounds from 2005–06 to 2008–09, making her the only D-I women's player to date to surpass the 2,000-rebound mark.

The only player on this list to be enshrined in the Naismith Memorial Basketball Hall of Fame is Cheryl Miller.

Only one player among the top 25 played at more than one school, namely Tracy Claxton, who played two seasons at Kansas before transferring to Old Dominion.

Key

Top 25 career rebounding leaders

Footnotes

References
General
 
 

Specific

Rebounding, career
Lists of college women's basketball players in the United States